Kamala Prasad Agarwala was an Indian politician. He was elected to the Lok Sabha, the lower house of the Parliament of India as a member of the Indian National Congress.

References

External links
 Official biographical sketch in Parliament of India website

India MPs 1971–1977
Lok Sabha members from Assam
Indian National Congress politicians from Assam
1909 births
Year of death missing